Sebrae ("Support Service for Micro and Small Enterprises"), is a Brazilian autonomous social institution part of the  whose aim is to foster the development of micro and small enterprises, stimulating entrepreneurship in the country .

Founded in 1972 with the name of Cebrae (Centro Brasileiro de Apoio à Pequena e Média Empresa), it was an entity associated with the Brazilian federal government. In October 1990, it was renamed Sebrae (Serviço Brasileiro de apoio às Micro e Pequenas Empresas), detaching itself from public administration and becoming an autonomous, non-profit social service.

Sebrae's current chairman is Guilherme Afif Domingos. The president of its National Deliberative Council is Roberto Simões.

References

External links 
  Official site in English

Business organisations based in Brazil
Non-profit organisations based in Brazil
1972 establishments in Brazil
Entrepreneurship organizations